Shaumiani is village in the Marneuli Municipality, Kvemo Kartli region of Georgia. Until 1925 it was named Shulaveri or Shulaver, later being renamed after Stepan Shahumyan. As of 2014, when it was downgraded from a small town (daba) to a village, its population was 3,107 persons. 

It was the administrative center of the Borchaly uezd of the Tiflis Governorate until 1929, and of the Borchaly Rayon until 1947 when it was transferred to Marneuli and the district was renamed.

Notable inhabitants 

 Maro Markarian, Armenian poet
 Benjamin Markarian, Armenian astronomer
 Alexander Melik-Pashayev, Armenian conductor

See also
 Kvemo Kartli

References 

Populated places in Marneuli Municipality
Tiflis Governorate